Makdin or Makedin, also rendered as Makeh Din, may refer to:
 Makdin-e Olya
 Makdin-e Sofla